Abala is a 1973 Indian Malayalam film, directed by Thoppil Bhasi. The film stars Madhu, Jayabharathi, KPAC Lalitha and Adoor Bhasi in the lead roles. The film has musical score by V. Dakshinamoorthy.

Cast
 Madhu 
 Jayabharathi
 KPAC Lalitha
 Adoor Bhasi
 Sankaradi 
Bahadoor
 Sreelatha Namboothiri 
 T. R. Omana
 M. G. Soman
 Vijayakumar

Soundtrack
The music was composed by V. Dakshinamoorthy and the lyrics were written by Sreekumaran Thampi, Ashwathy, S. K. Nair, Kottayathu Thamburan, Puthukkad Krishnakumar and Thunchathezhuthachan.

References

1973 films
1970s Malayalam-language films